William Davis Daly (June 4, 1851 – July 31, 1900) was an American Democratic Party politician who represented New Jersey's 7th congressional district in the United States House of Representatives from 1899 to 1900.

Early life and education
Daly was born in Jersey City, New Jersey. He attended the public schools, and from the age of fourteen until he was nineteen was employed as an iron molder. He studied law, was admitted to the bar in 1874 and commenced practice in Hudson County, New Jersey.

Career
He was an assistant United States attorney for New Jersey 1885-1888. He was a member of the New Jersey General Assembly from 1889 to 1891, and a judge of the district court of Hoboken from 1891 until his resignation in 1892. He was a member of the New Jersey Senate from 1892 to 1898. He was a delegate to the 1896 Democratic National Convention, chairman of the Democratic State convention in 1896 and member of the State committee from 1896 to 1898.

Tenure in Congress
Daly was elected as a Democrat to the Fifty-sixth Congress and served from March 4, 1899, until his death at Hoboken, New Jersey. His funeral was held at the First Presbyterian Church in Hoboken and was interred in New York Bay Cemetery (now known as Bayview – New York Bay Cemetery) in Jersey City, New Jersey.

See also
List of United States Congress members who died in office (1900–1949)

Notes

References

External links

William Davis Daly at The Political Graveyard

Memorial addresses on the life and character of William D. Daly late a representative from New Jersey delivered in the House of Representatives and Senate frontispiece 1901

1851 births
1900 deaths
Politicians from Jersey City, New Jersey
Democratic Party New Jersey state senators
Democratic Party members of the United States House of Representatives from New Jersey
Democratic Party members of the New Jersey General Assembly
Burials at Bayview – New York Bay Cemetery
19th-century American politicians